Larry LaRocco (born August 25, 1946) is an American politician who served two terms in the U.S. House of Representatives, representing the Idaho's 1st congressional district. LaRocco ran for lieutenant governorship in 2006 and the U.S. Senate in 2008; he was defeated by Jim Risch in the general election both times.

Early life and family
LaRocco was born in Van Nuys, a district of Los Angeles. He earned a Bachelor of Arts from the University of Portland in 1967. He earned his M.S. from Boston University in 1969. He also studied at the Johns Hopkins School of Advanced International Studies.

LaRocco and his wife Chris have two children and two grandchildren.

Military service
LaRocco joined the U.S. Army and was commissioned on August 15, 1969; he was eventually promoted to captain and served in military intelligence at the Intelligence Data Handling Systems (IDHS) at 7th Army Headquarters in Heidelberg, Germany towards the end of his army career. On May 24, 1972, the Baader-Meinhof Gang, the precursor of the Red Army Faction, exploded a car bomb outside of Campbell Barracks which killed three of LaRocco's fellow soldiers. LaRocco was honorably discharged on June 10, 1972.

Political career

In 1975, LaRocco took a job as northern Idaho field co-ordinator for Idaho U.S. Senator Frank Church, a position he held until Church's defeat in 1980; in 1976, he also was the co-ordinator for the Oregon primary election for Church's Presidential run.

In the 1982 elections, LaRocco was the Democratic nominee for Idaho's 1st congressional district; he lost to incumbent Larry Craig, but received 46.5 percent of the vote on his first try for public office. LaRocco also gained notice that year for taking jobs for one week in each of the district's 19 counties. He variously worked on a garbage truck, picked apples, waited on tables, worked in a nursing home and on a logging road crew, fed Coho smolt and processed cheese, among other things.

After the 1982 race, he became the vice-president of a brokerage firm in 1983. In 1986, he ran for the Idaho Legislature, losing an Idaho State Senate race in Ada County to Republican incumbent Jim Risch.

U.S. House of Representatives
LaRocco won Idaho's 1st congressional district seat in the United States House of Representatives in 1990 when incumbent Larry Craig ran successfully for the United States Senate. He was easily re-elected in 1992, winning every county in the district and with a 50,000-vote margin over his main opponent—a surprising margin, considering the 1st has historically been a very Republican district.

LaRocco was the only member of Congress from Idaho to vote for the Omnibus Budget Reconciliation Act of 1993. The vote proved to be quite unpopular in the district, and was exploited by Republicans in LaRocco's subsequent election campaigns.

LaRocco was decisively defeated in his attempt to win a third term in 1994 by Republican Helen Chenoweth, becoming one of a large number of Democrats to lose their seats in a nationwide string of Republican victories as the Republicans took control of the House for the first time in 40 years. LaRocco would be the last Democrat to represent Idaho in Congress until the election of Walt Minnick to the 1st congressional district seat in 2008.

Lieutenant Governor campaign
On March 18, 2006, LaRocco filed to run for Lieutenant Governor of Idaho. In the May 23 primary he won the nomination but lost to Risch in the November 7, 2006 general election.

U.S. Senate campaign

In April 2007, LaRocco announced that he would be a candidate for the U.S. Senate. It was the third time LaRocco ran against Risch in an election, as LaRocco and Risch both decisively won their respective primaries on May 27, 2008. LaRocco's campaign invested in a grassroots network.

A key feature of the LaRocco campaign was his "Working for the Senate" program. During the campaign, LaRocco worked at thirty-five separate positions around the state of Idaho. He engaged his opponents in a series of debates around the state of Idaho.  On August 18, 2008, he and Independent candidate Rex Rammell met for a one-hour debate in Coeur d'Alene. These two met again in Sandpoint on September 10.  A third debate took place on the campus of the College of Idaho in Caldwell on September 25.  LaRocco and Rammell were joined at this event by Libertarian candidate Kent Marmon and independent candidate Pro-Life (the legal name of the former Marvin Richardson).

A fourth debate was held between LaRocco and Rammell on October 1, 2008 at the University of Idaho, in Moscow.

KLEW-TV, the CBS affiliate located in Lewiston, hosted a debate on October 8 which featured Larry LaRocco, Jim Risch and Rex Rammell.  This was the first time that the Republican candidate joined his opponents in a debate in 2008.

Rammell and LaRocco met once again for a debate in Idaho Falls on October 13. Three days later, the two debated for the seventh time. This time the debate was held on the campus of the College of Southern Idaho in Twin Falls.

KTVB-TV, the NBC affiliate located in Boise sponsored a debate on October 21 between Jim Risch, Larry LaRocco, Rex Rammell and Pro-Life on the campus of Northwest Nazarene College in Nampa.  This 90 minute forum was co-hosted by the Idaho Press-Tribune and the Idaho Business Review.  It marked only the second time that Republican Jim Risch was present for any of these debates.

The statewide debate hosted by Idaho Public Television, the League of Women Voters and the Idaho Press Club was held on October 23 in Boise. Four of the five candidates for the United States Senate were in attendance. Republican Jim Risch was not present.

References

External links
Larry LaRocco for U.S. Senate official campaign website
 
Campaign contributions at OpenSecrets.org
Profile at SourceWatch

 

1946 births
Living people
American people of Italian descent
United States Army officers
Stanford University alumni
University of Portland alumni
Politicians from Los Angeles
Democratic Party members of the United States House of Representatives from Idaho
People from Van Nuys, Los Angeles
People from McCall, Idaho
Candidates in the 2008 United States elections
Military personnel from California
Members of Congress who became lobbyists